Adam's Curse: A Future Without Men (also known as Adam's Curse: A Story of Sex, Genetics, and the Extinction of Men) is a 2003 book by Oxford University human genetics professor Bryan Sykes expounding his hypothesis that with the declining sperm count in men and the continual atrophy of the Y chromosome, within 5,000 generations (approximately 125,000 years) men shall become extinct.

Sykes thinks one of the options for humanity's survival is unisex reproduction by females: female eggs fertilised by the nuclear X chromosomes of another female and implanted using in vitro fertilisation methods. He also introduces the possibility of moving the SRY and associated genes responsible for maleness and male fertility to another chromosome, which he refers to as "the Adonis chromosome", engendering fertile males with an XX karyotype.

See also
 Sex-determination system
 Y-chromosomal Adam

References

External links
 Review of Adam's Curse from The Daily Telegraph
 Review of Adam's Curse in The Journal of Clinical Investigation

2003 non-fiction books
Futurology books
Genetics books
Genetics in the United Kingdom